The 1981 season was the Minnesota Vikings' 21st in the National Football League, their 15th under head coach Bud Grant, and their final season at Metropolitan Stadium. They finished with a 7–9 record, and missed the playoffs for the second time in three seasons.

The Vikings attempted 709 passes in 1981 (44.3 per game), a league record that stood for 30 years until it was broken by the 2012 Detroit Lions.

Offseason

1981 Draft

 The Vikings traded their first-round selection (18th overall) to the Baltimore Colts in exchange for the Colts' second- and fifth-round selections (39th and 123rd overall) and the second-round selection they received from the Redskins (52nd overall).
 The Vikings traded their third- and fifth-round selections (71st and 128th overall) to the New Orleans Saints in exchange for T Steve Riley.
 The Vikings traded RB Chuck Foreman to the New England Patriots in exchange for the Patriots' third-round selection (74th overall).
 The Vikings traded their sixth-round selection (154th overall) and 1982 fifth-round selection (120th overall) to the Miami Dolphins in exchange for C Jim Langer.
 The Vikings traded their ninth-round selection (236th overall) to the Seattle Seahawks in exchange for T Nick Bebout.

Roster

Preseason

Regular season
After opening the season with back-to-back losses, the Vikings ran off five straight wins and sat near the top of the NFC at midseason. After splitting their next four games, the Vikings were 7–4 and poised for a playoff run—however, they lost their last five games to close out the year.

The Vikings were led by quarterback Tommy Kramer, who enjoyed the most productive season of his career, throwing for 3,912 yards and 26 touchdowns. However, Kramer also threw 24 interceptions in 1981. The Vikings set an NFL record for pass attempts with 709.

A trio of offensive standouts paced the Vikings in 1981 at the skill positions. Running back Ted Brown was the team's main ball carrier, rushing for 1,063 yards, and also came in third in the NFL with 83 pass receptions; he scored eight touchdowns. Veteran wide receiver Sammy White also eclipsed the 1,000 yard mark for the first time in his career (1,001) and tight end Joe Senser, who would later become a color analyst on radio for the Vikings, logged 1,004 yards receiving with eight touchdowns; Senser went to the Pro Bowl for the 1981 season.

Schedule

Note: Intra-division opponents are in bold text.

Game summaries

Week 1: at Tampa Bay Buccaneers

Week 2: vs Oakland Raiders

Week 3: vs Detroit Lions

Week 6: at San Diego Chargers

Week 7: vs Philadelphia Eagles

Week 9: at Denver Broncos

Week 10: vs Tampa Bay Buccaneers

Week 11: vs New Orleans Saints

Week 16: vs Kansas City Chiefs

Standings

Statistics

Team leaders

 Vikings single season record although tackles were not official until 2001.

League rankings

References

Minnesota Vikings seasons
Minnesota Vikings
Minnesota